Josephus 'Rudi' Jacobs (born 1960) is a South African lawn bowler.

Bowls career
Jacobs was selected for the Lawn bowls squad at the 2014 Commonwealth Games but was replaced by Petrus Breitenbach. In 2018 Jacobs was selected as part of the South Africa team for the 2018 Commonwealth Games on the Gold Coast in Queensland.

Jacobs won the 2015 singles at the National Championships bowling for the Parys Bowls Club.

References

1960 births
Living people
South African male bowls players
Commonwealth Games medallists in lawn bowls
Commonwealth Games bronze medallists for South Africa
Bowls players at the 2018 Commonwealth Games
Medallists at the 1998 Commonwealth Games